Søren Peter Petersen (December 6, 1894 – 1945) was a Danish heavyweight professional boxer who competed in the 1920s and 1930s. He was born in Kolding and died in Belgium. Petersen won a silver medal in boxing at the 1920 Summer Olympics, losing to British boxer Ronald Rawson in the final. Petersen was knocked down seven times in the first three rounds of the fight, at the time an Olympic record; he did not knock Rawson down a single time in the fight. Peterson followed his 1920 achievements exactly in boxing at the 1924 Summer Olympics where he won another silver when he lost to Otto von Porat in the final.

References

External links
 
 profile

1894 births
1945 deaths
Heavyweight boxers
Olympic boxers of Denmark
Boxers at the 1920 Summer Olympics
Boxers at the 1924 Summer Olympics
Olympic silver medalists for Denmark
Olympic medalists in boxing
Danish male boxers
Danish male weightlifters
Medalists at the 1924 Summer Olympics
Medalists at the 1920 Summer Olympics
People from Kolding
Sportspeople from the Region of Southern Denmark